Active citizenship or engaged citizenship refers to active participation of a citizen under the law of a nation discussing and educating themselves in politics and society, as well as a philosophy espoused by organizations and educational institutions which advocates that individuals, charitable organizations, and companies have certain roles and responsibilities to society and the environment. Active citizens may be involved in public advocacy and protest, working to effect change in their communities.

Description 

Active citizenship can be seen as an articulation of the debate over rights versus responsibilities. If a body gives rights to the people under its remit, then those same people might have certain responsibilities to uphold. This would be most obvious at a country or nation-state level, but could also be of wider scope, such as the Internet (netizen) or Earth (global citizenship). The implication is that an active citizen fulfills both their rights and responsibilities in a balanced way.

A potential problem with this concept is that although rights are often written down as part of the law, responsibilities are not as well defined, and there may be disagreements amongst the citizens as to what the responsibilities are. For example, in the United Kingdom, citizens have the right to free health care, but voting in elections is not compulsory, even though many people would define this as a responsibility.

Writing a clear definition of responsibilities for an active citizen can be more problematic than writing a list of rights. For example, although voting might be considered a basic responsibility by many people, there are some who through disability or other issues are not able to participate fully in the voting process.

An active citizen is someone who takes a role in the community; the term has been identified with volunteering by writers such as Jonathan Tisch, who wrote in the Huffington Post in 2010 advocating that busy Americans should try to help others, particularly by offering high-level professional expertise in such areas as banking, education, engineering, and technology to help the less fortunate.

Active citizenship is considered a buzzword by somedue to its vague definition. Examples include volunteering, donating, and recycling.

Developments in social media and media literacy have changed how scholars begin to look at, and define active citizenship. Active citizenship in politics can lead to an apparent consumption of the engaged person rather than offering people with an informed, active opinion. Social media sites let people spread information, and create events to provide opportunities for engaged citizenship.

Social media and the internet provide a public access point to government affairs, and police, away from town hall meetings, creating communities with similar concerns to recognize the pitfalls of governments and government policies.

Examples of active citizenship in education 
Due to concerns over such things as a lack of interest in elections (reflected by low voter turnout), the British Government has launched a citizenship education program. Citizenship education is now compulsory in UK schools up to 14 and is often available as an option beyond that age.

In Scotland, UK, active citizenship has been one of the three major themes of community policy since The Osler Report (section 6.6) in 1998. The Scottish Government's 2009 guidelines for community learning and development, Working and Learning Together, has active citizenship as a target within other policy aims. Britain has a points-based immigration system, and in 2009 was considering a probationary period for newly admitted immigrants which would examine, in part, how well they were being so-called active citizens.

In Denmark, active citizenship is part of the curriculum in Danish teacher's education. The course is defined as 36 lessons.

In Canada, there is an Active Citizenship Course being run at Mohawk College in Hamilton, Ontario. It is a compulsory course that is delivered by the Language Studies Department to all students at the college.

In the United States, writer Catherine Crier wondered in the Huffington Post about whether Americans had lost sight of Thomas Jefferson's sense of active citizenship. Crier lamented how Americans have tended to neglect participating in voluntary associations, and tend to live as "strangers apart from the rest", quoting Tocqueville. In contrast, writer Eboo Patel in Newsweek suggested that President Obama had a somewhat different sense of active citizenship, meaning strong families, a vibrant civic center in which persons of different faiths and secular backgrounds work together, with government acting as a "catalyst".

Jose Antonio Vargas writes in his memoirs, Dear America: Notes from an Undocumented Citizen, that undocumented immigrants, who contribute to the cultural, social, and economic fabrics of their adopted countries, are and ought to be considered citizens of those countries, notwithstanding what immigration authorities call them. He calls this a "citizenship of participation".

Notes and references

See also 
 Junior Chamber International
 Liquid democracy
 Participatory democracy

External links 
Weblog entries on active citizenship

 
Social philosophy
Social responsibility